Elk Rapids is a village in the U.S. state of Michigan. The population was 1,529 at the 2020 census. Located in the southwest of Antrim County, Elk Rapids lies on an isthmus between Elk Lake and Grand Traverse Bay, a bay of Lake Michigan. The Elk River bisects the village, flowing west.

History
The first settler in the Elk Rapids area was Abram S. Wadsworth, from Connecticut. Wadsworth platted the area in 1852, calling it Stevens. A post office opened in 1854. In 1858, Wadsworth renamed the area to Elk Rapids, after finding a pair of elk antlers near the mouth of the later-named Elk River. In 1863, Antrim County was organized, and Elk Rapids was made the county seat. However, the seat was moved to the more centrally-located Bellaire in 1879. In 1892, Elk Rapids became a station on a spur of the Chicago and West Michigan Railway. The town was incorporated as a village in 1900.

Geography

Demographics

2010 census
As of the census of 2010, there were 1,642 people, 791 households, and 478 families residing in the village. The racial makeup of the village was 96.6% White, 0.7% African American, 1.2% Native American, 0.5% Asian, 0.1% Pacific Islander, 0.2% from other races, and 0.7% from two or more races. Hispanic or Latino of any race were 1.3% of the population.

There were 791 households, of which 21.0% had children under the age of 18 living with them, 48.4% were married couples living together, 9.6% had a female householder with no husband present, 2.4% had a male householder with no wife present, and 39.6% were non-families. 34.8% of all households were made up of individuals, and 17.9% had someone living alone who was 65 years of age or older. The average household size was 2.07 and the average family size was 2.63.

The median age in the village was 52.4 years. 18.6% of residents were under the age of 18; 5.6% were between the ages of 18 and 24; 16.3% were from 25 to 44; 30.9% were from 45 to 64; and 28.7% were 65 years of age or older. The gender makeup of the village was 46.5% male and 53.5% female.

2000 census
As of the census of 2000, there were 1,700 people, 769 households, and 483 families residing in the village. The racial makeup of the village was 97.00% White, 0.29% African American, 1.00% Native American, 0.12% Asian, 0.24% Pacific Islander, 0.59% from other races, and 0.76% from two or more races. Hispanic or Latino of any race were 2.12% of the population.

There were 769 households, out of which 27.8% had children under the age of 18 living with them, 49.7% were married couples living together, 10.8% had a female householder with no husband present, and 37.1% were non-families. 34.6% of all households were made up of individuals, and 17.3% had someone living alone who was 65 years of age or older.  The average household size was 2.20 and the average family size was 2.83.

In the village, the population was spread out, with 24.2% under the age of 18, 5.1% from 18 to 24, 23.2% from 25 to 44, 27.5% from 45 to 64, and 19.9% who were 65 years of age or older.  The median age was 43 years. For every 100 females, there were 94.5 males.  For every 100 females age 18 and over, there were 83.2 males.

The median income for a household in the village was $31,382, and the median income for a family was $45,179. Males had a median income of $30,845 versus $23,167 for females. The per capita income for the village was $19,735.  About 7.6% of families and 8.2% of the population were below the poverty line, including 11.1% of those under age 18 and 5.8% of those age 65 or over.

Major highways
 runs north–south through Elk Rapids, east of the central business district. US 31 parallels the shore of Lake Michigan, and can be used to access the nearby city of Traverse City.

Images

References

External links

Historic Elk Rapids Town Hall Association
Village of Elk Rapids, MI
Township of Elk Rapids, MI
Elk Rapids Public Schools
The Elk Rapids Area Chamber of Commerce

Villages in Antrim County, Michigan
Villages in Michigan
1900 establishments in Michigan
Populated places established in 1900
Michigan populated places on Lake Michigan